Bruno (released as The Dress Code on DVD and VHS) is a 2000 American comedy film starring Alex D. Linz and Shirley MacLaine. The film is the first and, as of 2021, the only film ever directed by MacLaine (barring her 1975 documentary feature).

Distributed by New Angel Inc., Bruno premiered at the 2000 Los Angeles Film Festival in a limited theatrical release. From there, the film was distributed straight to cable television and rights to it were acquired by Starz.

Plot
Bruno Battaglia is a young boy attending an American Roman Catholic school. Bruno's estranged father Dino, a police officer, left the family long ago and Bruno lives with his mother Angela. Angela is overweight and dresses flamboyantly in outfits that she designs and makes herself, standing out in stark contrast to the rest of their conservative Italian American neighborhood.

While competing in advancing levels of the Catholic school spelling bee, Bruno decides to start wearing dresses. He wears them as a source of empowerment as well as feeling the need to express himself. He often identifies with angels and, when challenged that he can't wear a dress to the spelling bee championship in Vatican City, Bruno points out that even the Pope wears a dress. For his choice in outfits, Bruno receives heavy criticism from fellow students and faculty, especially the school's Mother Superior as well as becoming a target of the school's bullies. Initially supported only by his best friend Shawniqua, as he progresses further in the spelling competition, his choices of self-expression eventually become accepted by his peers and his superiors. Bruno wins the spelling bee competition and meets the Pope. With the help of his grandmother, Helen, Bruno also begins to form a bond with Dino who, in turn, is inspired by his son to pursue his long abandoned childhood dream of becoming an opera singer, despite previously being unwilling to accept his son, even leaving the room before Bruno sings in a dress.

Cast and characters
Alex D. Linz as Bruno Battaglia
Shirley MacLaine as Helen
Gary Sinise as Dino Battaglia
Kathy Bates as Mother Superior
Stacey Halprin as Angela Battaglia
Kiami Davael as Shawniqua
Joey Lauren Adams as Donna Marie
Jennifer Tilly as Dolores
Brett Butler as Sister Della Rosa

Soundtrack
"Parigi, o Cara" from La Traviata, performed by The RCA Italiana Opera Orchestra, Carlo Bergonzi and Montserrat Caballé
"Au fond du temple saint" performed by Jussi Bjoerling and the RCA Victor ORchestra, Robert Merril
"Di Provenza" from La Traviata, performed by the RCA Italiana Opera Orchestra, Carlo Bergzoni

Reception
On review aggregator website Rotten Tomatoes the film has a score of 20% based on reviews from 5 critics, with an average rating of 3.9/10.

Lael Loewenstein of Variety wrote "It seems especially apt that Shirley MacLaine, a high priestess of self-expression, should make her feature directing debut with a film about a child's quest for individuality. With "Bruno," MacLaine achieves a mixed success. Her name, promo skills and high-profile cast would seem to assure pic theatrical visibility, albeit likely in niche markets".

References

External links

2000 comedy films
Films directed by Shirley MacLaine
Films shot in North Carolina
Films shot in New York City
American comedy films
2000 directorial debut films
2000s English-language films
2000s American films